Events from the year 1968 in Denmark.

Incumbents
 Monarch – Frederick IX
 Prime minister – Jens Otto Krag

Events

Sports
 August – Ole Ritter becomes the first non-Italian to win Trofeo Matteotti.

Births
12 February – Lisbeth Zornig Andersen, economist and author
26 May – Frederik, Crown Prince of Denmark, heir apparent to the Danish throne
19 June – Peter Tanev, weather presenter and author
10 August – Lene Rantala, handball player

Deaths
 18 January – Adam Fischer, sculptor (born 1888)
 19 April – Poul Reumert, actor (born 1883)
 3 September – Carl Pedersen, rower (born 1884)
 8 December – Anders Petersen, sport shooter, competitor at the 1920 Summer Olympics (born 1876)

See also
1968 in Danish television

References

 
Denmark
Years of the 20th century in Denmark
1960s in Denmark